Ilias Solakis (born 15 December 1974) is a Greek former professional footballer who played as a forward.

Career
Born in Florina, Solakis began his professional career with Veria and played for the club in the Alpha Ethniki during the 1996–97 and 1997–98 seasons. He played in the Alpha Ethniki again with Panachaiki during the 1999–2000 and 2000–01 seasons. On summer of 2001 he moved to APOEL where he helped the club to win the Cypriot First Division 2001-02 by scoring 15 goals in 26 appearances. The next summer Solakis returned to Greece and had a brief spell in the Greek Super League with AEK Athens during the 2004–05 season. He also played for Panionios, Niki Volos, Doxa Drama, Kastoria, PAS Giannina and Diagoras. On 29 September 2011 he signed a 1-year contract with Asteras Tripolis.

References

External links
Profile at epae.org

Profile at Onsports.gr 
Profile at Insports.gr 

1974 births
Living people
Greek footballers
Veria F.C. players
Panachaiki F.C. players
AEK Athens F.C. players
Panionios F.C. players
Niki Volos F.C. players
Kastoria F.C. players
Almopos Aridea F.C. players
Olympiacos Volos F.C. players
Asteras Tripolis F.C. players
APOEL FC players
PAS Giannina F.C. players
Super League Greece players
Expatriate footballers in Cyprus
Association football forwards
Footballers from Florina